Cliftonia monophylla, the buck-wheat tree, buckwheat tree or black titi, is a tree native to the southeastern United States. It is the sole species in the genus Cliftonia.

References

External links

Cliftonia monophylla
Cliftonia monophylla
Plants For A Future: Cliftonia monophylla

Monotypic Ericales genera
Trees of the Southeastern United States
Ericales
Taxa named by Joseph Banks
Taxa named by Karl Friedrich von Gaertner